The Dansereau House, also known as the Caldwell Home, is a historic mansion located at 506 St. Philip Street in Thibodaux, Louisiana.

The first floor was built in 1845–47 for James A. Scudday. It was purchased by Canadians, the Dansereau family, after the American Civil War of 1861–1865. A second floor was added for its new owner, Dr Hercules Dansereau, in 1875. The house was repurposed as a bed and breakfast by its owner, Democratic Representative Damon Baldone, in 2010.

The property was designed by architect Henri Thiberge in the Italianate style, with a Second Empire roof. It has been listed on the National Register of Historic Places since November 21, 1978.

See also
 National Register of Historic Places listings in Lafourche Parish, Louisiana

References

Houses on the National Register of Historic Places in Louisiana
Italianate architecture in Louisiana
Second Empire architecture in Louisiana
Houses completed in 1845
National Register of Historic Places in Lafourche Parish, Louisiana